Pripyat, also known as Prypiat, is an abandoned city in northern Ukraine, located near the border with Belarus. Named after the nearby river, Pripyat, it was founded on 4 February 1970 as the ninth atomgrad (a type of closed town in the Soviet Union) to serve the nearby Chernobyl Nuclear Power Plant, which is located in the adjacent ghost city of Chernobyl. Pripyat was officially proclaimed a city in 1979 and had grown to a population of 49,360 by the time it was evacuated on the afternoon of 27 April 1986, one day after the Chernobyl disaster.

Although it was located within the administrative district of Ivankiv Raion (now Vyshhorod Raion since the 2020 raion reform), the abandoned municipality now has the status of city of regional significance within the larger Kyiv Oblast, and is administered directly from the capital of Kyiv. Pripyat is also supervised by the State Emergency Service of Ukraine, which manages activities for the entire Chernobyl Exclusion Zone. Following the 1986 Chernobyl nuclear disaster, the entire population of Pripyat was moved to the purpose-built city of Slavutych.

History

Early years

Access to Pripyat, unlike cities of military importance, was not restricted before the disaster, as the Soviet Union deemed nuclear power stations safer than other types of power plants. Nuclear power stations were presented as achievements of Soviet engineering, harnessing nuclear power for peaceful projects. The slogan "peaceful atom" was popular during those times. The original plan had been to build the plant only  from Kyiv, but the Ukrainian Academy of Sciences, among other bodies, expressed concern that would be too close to the city. After the disaster, the city of Pripyat was evacuated in two days.

Post-Chernobyl disaster

In 1986, the city of Slavutych was constructed to replace Pripyat. After the city of Chernobyl, this was the second-largest city for accommodating power plant workers and scientists in the Commonwealth of Independent States (CIS).

One notable landmark often featured in photographs of the city and visible from aerial-imaging websites is the long-abandoned Ferris wheel located in the Pripyat amusement park, which had been scheduled to have its official opening five days after the disaster, in time for May Day celebrations. The Azure Swimming Pool and Avanhard Stadium are two other popular tourist sites.

On 4 February 2020, former residents of Pripyat gathered in the abandoned city to celebrate the 50th anniversary of Pripyat's establishment. This was the first time former residents returned to the city since its abandonment in 1986.

The 2020 Chernobyl Exclusion Zone wildfires reached the outskirts of the town, but they did not reach the plant.

During the 2022 Russian invasion of Ukraine, the city was occupied by Russian forces during the Battle of Chernobyl after several hours of heavy fighting. On 31 March 2022, Russian troops withdrew from the plant and other parts of Kyiv Oblast. On 3 April 2022, Ukrainian troops took control of Pripyat again.

Infrastructure and statistics
The following statistics are from 1 January 1986.
 Population: 49,400 before the disaster. The average age was about 26 years old. Total living space was : 13,414 apartments in 160 apartment blocks, 18 halls of residence accommodating up to 7,621 single males or females, and eight halls of residence for married or de facto couples.
 Education: 15 kindergartens and elementary schools for 4,980 children, and five secondary schools for 6,786 students.
 Healthcare: One hospital that could accommodate up to 410 patients, and three clinics.
 Trade: 25 stores and malls; 27 cafes, cafeterias, and restaurants that collectively could serve up to 5,535 customers simultaneously. 10 warehouses that could hold 4,430 tons of goods.
 Culture: Three facilities: a culture palace, the Palace of Culture Energetik; a cinema; and a school of arts, with eight different societies.
 Sports: 10 gyms, 10 shooting galleries, three indoor swimming-pools, two stadiums.
 Recreation: One park, 35 playgrounds, 18,136 trees, 33,000 rose plants, 249,247 shrubs.
 Industry: Four factories with total annual turnover of 477,000,000 rubles. One nuclear power plant with four reactors (plus two more planned).
 Transportation: Yanov railway station, 167 urban buses, plus the nuclear power plant car park with 400 spaces.
 Telecommunication: 2,926 local phones managed by the Pripyat Phone Company, plus 1,950 phones owned by Chernobyl power station's administration, Jupiter plant, and Department of Architecture and Urban Development.

Safety

A concern is whether it is safe to visit Pripyat and its surroundings. The Zone of Alienation is considered relatively safe to visit, and several Ukrainian companies offer guided tours around the area. In most places within the city, the level of radiation does not exceed an equivalent dose of 1 μSv (one microsievert) per hour.

Climate

The climate of Pripyat is designated as Dfb (Warm-summer humid continental climate) on the Köppen Climate Classification System.

In popular culture

Films 
(Alphabetical by title)
 The film A Good Day to Die Hard (2013) is partly set in Pripyat.
 The horror film Chernobyl Diaries (2012) was inspired by the Chernobyl disaster in 1986 and takes place in Pripyat. 
 The majority of the film Land of Oblivion (2011) was shot on location in Pripyat.
 Pripyat is featured in the History Channel documentary Life After People. 
The majority of the Russian movie (originally a miniseries) Inseparable takes place in Pripyat.
 The drone manufacturer DJI produced Lost City of Chernobyl (May 2015), a documentary film about the work of photographer and cinematographer Philip Grossman and his five-year project in Pripyat and the Zone of Exclusion.
 Filmmaker Danny Cooke used a drone to capture shots of the abandoned amusement park, some residential shots of decaying walls, children's toys, and gas masks, and collected them in a 3-minute short film Postcards From Chernobyl (released in November 2014), while making footage for the CBS News 60 Minutes episode "Chernobyl: The Catastrophe That Never Ended" (early 2014).
 With the help of drones, aerial views of Pripyat were shot and later edited to appear as a deserted London in the film The Girl with All the Gifts (2016).
The film Transformers: Dark of the Moon (2011) shows a brief mission to Pripyat wherein the Autobots are first attacked by Shockwave while searching for a piece of alien technology which, in universe, is explained as being the catalyst to the Chernobyl disaster.
 The documentary White Horse (2008) was filmed in Pripyat.

Games
(Alphabetical by game title)
 A portion of the first-person shooter video game Call of Duty 4: Modern Warfare (2007) takes place in Pripyat, both in the campaign, and multiplayer. It also appears in the game's "Fifty thousand people used to live here. Now it's a ghost town" title sequence. The Azure swimming pool was featured as a point of interest in Call of Duty: Warzone (2020) on the fictional Verdansk City.
The segment is also referenced in the game's sequel, Call of Duty: Modern Warfare 3 (2011) and is playable as a portion of the game in Call of Duty: Modern Warfare Remastered.
The videogame Chernobylite is set in the Chernobyl Exclusion Zone.
In the videogame Counter-Strike: Global Offensive, the map named Cache sees the action in the Pripyat area, with the Terrorist team trying to blow up a warehouse which could presumably contain nuclear waste, while the Counter-Terrorist team tries to stop it.
The Azure Swimming Pool in Pripyat is featured in the video game PlayerUnknown's Battlegrounds (2017).
 The city of Pripyat is the primary location used in Atypical Games' Radiation City.
 The S.T.A.L.K.E.R. video game series, consisting of S.T.A.L.K.E.R.: Shadow of Chernobyl, S.T.A.L.K.E.R.: Clear Sky, and S.T.A.L.K.E.R.: Call of Pripyat, takes place entirely in and around Pripyat.
One special forces mission of the multi-player shooter Warface features a mission in the Pripyat area, including locations like the Azure Swimming Pool and Pripyat Amusement Park.
The indie survival horror videogame Liquidators based on the story of the Chernobyl Liquidators who were credited for limiting the immediate and long term effects of the Chernobyl disaster.

Literature
(Alphabetical by artist)
 In DC Comics'  Batwoman (2011) comic book series, the final mission of Kate Kane's training to become the titular superhero consists of a hostage rescue in the city.
 Markiyan Kamysh's novel, Stalking the Atomic City. Life among the decadent and the depraved of Chornobyl, about illegal trips to Chernobyl.
 The Chernobyl Poems of Lyubov Sirota by the professor of Washington University Paul Brians
 Lyubov Sirota’s novel "The Pripyat Syndrome"; Language: English, Publisher: Independently published (February 18, 2021), Paperback: 202 pages, ISBN 979-8710522875 – Lyubov Sirota (Author), Birgitta Ingemanson (Editor), Paul Brians (Editor), A. Yukhimenko (Illustrator), Natalia Ryumina (Translator)
 Much of the James Rollins' novel The Last Oracle takes place in Pripyat and around Chernobyl. The story revolves around a team of American "Killer Scientist" special agents who must stop a terrorist plot to unleash on the world the radiation of Lake Karachay, during the installation of the new sarcophagus over the Chernobyl nuclear power plant.
 The exclusion zone is the setting for Karl Schroeder's science fiction short story "The Dragon of Pripyat".
 A novel by R. D. Shah, The 4th Secret, includes a chapter (30) that takes place in Pripyat where a fictional group of Skoptsy heretics were holding two important people they had kidnapped.
 Martin Cruz Smith's novel Wolves Eat Dogs uses Pripyat as the setting for an investigation by Arkady Renko.

Music
(Alphabetical by artist)
 The Ukrainian singer Alyosha recorded most of the video for her Eurovision 2010 entry, "Sweet People", in Pripyat.
 Ash, the rock band from Northern Ireland, has a song titled Pripyat included in their album A–Z Vol.1.
 The music video for the Crucifix song "Chernobyl" was filmed in Pripyat. 
 The song "Dead City" by the Ukrainian Symphonic Metal band DELIA is about Pripyat, and scenes from the music video were shot in the city. DELIA's vocalist, Anastasia Sverkunova, was born in Pripyat just before the Chernobyl disaster.
 In 2006, musician Example featured Pripyat in his 18-minute documentary of the ghost town and in his promotional video for his track, "What We Made".
 In 2021, a second music video for Go_A's Eurovision 2021 entry "Shum" displayed the Chernobyl Nuclear Power Plant from a far distance.
 The German pianist and composer Hauschka features Pripyat on the second track of his album Abandoned Cities.
The Scottish post-rock band Mogwai included a song called "Pripyat" on their album Atomic (2016), which is a soundtrack to Mark Cousins' documentary Atomic, Living in Dread and Promise.
The Irish folk-rock singer Christy Moore included a song called "Farewell to Pripyat" on his album Voyage (1989), the song credited to Tim Dennehy.
In 2014, for the 20th anniversary of the original release of The Division Bell, a music video for the song "Marooned" was produced and released on the official Pink Floyd website. Aubrey Powell of Hipgnosis directed the video, some parts of which were filmed in Pripyat during the first week of April 2014.
 Marillion guitarist Steve Rothery's first solo album is called The Ghosts of Pripyat (2014).
 The Australian rapper Seth Sentry included the two-part song "Pripyat" in his album Strange New Past (2015).
The English rock band Suede used the city to shoot their music video clip Life Is Golden, including takes of the Azure Swimming Pool, Pripyat amusement park, and Polissya hotel.
 The Swedish Industrial Metal band ZAVOD has a song titled "Pripyat" on their debut album Industrial City, released in 2012. The song covers the aftermath for the people of Pripyat who were affected by the disaster at the Chernobyl Nuclear Power Plant in 1986.
 The Italian Rapper Caparezza has a song titled "Come Pripyat" on his album Exuvia, released in 2021.
 The Belarusian post-punk band Molchat Doma released a music video for their song titled, "Waves" as part of their album Etazhi. The music video was filmed in Pripyat through a series of varying drone shots; displaying famous landmarks of the abandoned city.

Television
(Alphabetical by series)
 The 60 Minutes episode "Chernobyl: The Catastrophe That Never Ended" (early 2014) aired on CBS.
 HBO's drama miniseries Chernobyl (2019) is based on the Chernobyl Nuclear Disaster. The scenes set in 1986 Pripyat were filmed in Vilnius, Lithuania.
 David Attenborough: A Life On Our Planet starts in Pripyat.
 The American paranormal investigation series Destination Truth conducted an overnight investigation within Pripyat.
 The Ed, Edd n Eddy episode "Once upon an Ed" shows a cameo of Pripyat in a jawbreaker storage vault.
 in the Chris Tarrant: Extreme Railways Season 5 episode "Extreme Nuclear Railway: A Journey Too Far?" (episode 22), Chris Tarrant visits Chernobyl on his journey through Ukraine.
 Manhunt: Unabomber season 1 episode 3 mentions this town as the homeland of Slavic people.
 Discovery Science Channel's Mysteries of the Abandoned episode "Chernobyl's Deadly Secrets", produced and hosted by Philip Grossman, was filmed over a four-day period in Pripyat and the Chernobyl Nuclear Power Plant, in 2017.
 In the Spider-Man season five episode "Six Forgotten Warriors Part 2: Unclaimed Legacy", Spider-Man, Silver Sable, the Wild Pack, Kingpin and the Insidious Six later find themselves at the Chernobyl Nuclear Power Plant.
 The Animal Planet nature investigation series River Monsters conducted an extensive 2013 investigation within Pripyat, the exclusion zone, and the Chernobyl Power Plant in search of a radioactive mutated wels catfish.
 Top Gear series 21 episode 3 features a race to run out of fuel before reaching the city, with two of the presenters, Jeremy Clarkson and James May, driving through the abandoned city.

Transport

The city was served by Yaniv station on the Chernihiv–Ovruch railway. It was an important passenger hub of the line and was located between the southern suburb of Pripyat and the village of Yaniv. An electric train terminus of Semikhody, built in 1988 and located in front of the nuclear plant, is currently the only operating station near Pripyat connecting it to Slavutych.

Personalities
 Markiyan Kamysh (born 1988), writer, illegal Chernobyl explorer ("stalker")
 Alexander Sirota (born 1976), photographer, journalist and filmmaker
 Lyubov Sirota (born 1956), poet, writer, playwright, journalist and translator

Gallery

See also
Chernobyl Exclusion Zone
Cultural impact of the Chernobyl disaster
FC Stroitel Pripyat

References

External links

 Pripyat-Info - Informational Portal: «PRIPYAT :: EXCLUSION ZONE»
 Pripyat.com - Site created by former residents
 25 years of satellite imagery over Chernobyl Pripyat map
 pripyatpanorama.com - Pripyat in Panoramas Project
 exploringthezone.com  - 5-year project documenting the Pripyat and Chernobyl Zone
 Pripyat-city.ru - Blog related to Pripyat
 ChernobylGallery.com - Photographs of Pripyat and Chernobyl
  - 2018 Footage of Pripyat and Chernobyl

 
Populated places established in the Ukrainian Soviet Socialist Republic
Cities and towns built in the Soviet Union
Cities in Kyiv Oblast
Ghost towns in the Chernobyl Exclusion Zone
Radioactively contaminated areas
Environmental disaster ghost towns
Modern ruins
Ghost towns in Ukraine
Cities of regional significance in Ukraine
1970 establishments in Ukraine
Populated places established in 1970
Company towns in Ukraine
Socialist planned cities
Populated places disestablished in 1986
1986 disestablishments in Ukraine